Johnny Edmond (born 13 September 1969) is a Mauritian former international footballer who played as a striker. He won seven caps for the Mauritius national football team. Having originated from the Chagos Islands he has been capped by their national side, which is not recognised by FIFA.

References

1969 births
Living people
Mauritian footballers
Mauritius international footballers
Association football forwards